The Lemon Farm (1935) is a novel by Australian author Martin Boyd.

Plot outline
In a small English seaside village, Lady Davina Chelgrove leaves her husband Nigel for another, younger man. The affair proceeds towards a tragic ending. The "Lemon Farm" of the title is located in the Mediterranean and is the ideal that the two lovers aspire towards.

Critical reception
A reviewer in The Sydney Morning Herald found a lot to like with the novel: "Well constructed and well written The Lemon Farm is probably the most successful novel that Mr Boyd has yet written. His portrait of Davina herself is not only attractive but firmly and consistently modelled."

In The Argus the reviewer found this a better novel that the author's previous: "The Lemon Farm is written with a firm assured touch yet with subtlety and delicacy. In the main it is tragi-comedy though it deepens into tragedy."

See also
 1935 in Australian literature

References

Novels by Martin Boyd
1935 Australian novels
Novels set in England